Tim Powell (born 14 April 1968) is a former Australian rules footballer who played with Richmond and Carlton in the Australian Football League (AFL). 

Powell, originally from Berrigan, was used up forward and on the half back flanks while at Richmond. He kicked 17 goals in 1989 and early the following season had two 'Best on ground' performances which were later awarded acknowledged in the Brownlow Medal count. 

Before the 1993 season he was traded to Carlton for pick 28 in the draft and in his first year at his new club lined on the half forward flank in their 1993 Grand Final loss to Essendon.

References

Holmesby, Russell and Main, Jim (2007). The Encyclopedia of AFL Footballers. 7th ed. Melbourne: Bas Publishing.

1968 births
Living people
Richmond Football Club players
Carlton Football Club players
New South Wales Australian rules football State of Origin players
Australian rules footballers from New South Wales